The Bihta Air Force Station is an Indian Air Force (IAF) base in Bihta, Bihar, India. The military airfield, lies 40 kilometres southwest of state capital Patna and is spread over an area of around 900 acres.

Civilian Operations
In 2016, the Airport Authority of India (AAI) proposed to develop a civil enclave at the Bihta airbase to serve as a second airport for Patna. The Indian Air Force gave its consent in April 2016 for commercial flight operations from Bihta as a medium-term measure for development air operations from Patna. The terminal building of the civil enclave will have the capacity to cater up to 2.5 million passengers per annum. It will be two-storied, with the ground floor for arrival and first floor for the departure of passengers. The Khagaul-Shivala-Bihta road, which will be broadened to four lanes, will connect the airport with the city. AAI had earlier estimated a requirement of 600 acres of land for the first Phase and another 790 acres for the second Phase in lieu of the existing Jayprakash Narayan International Airport in Patna.

In October 2016, Bihar cabinet approved the Patna master plan 2031 which envisaged development of a new airport at Bihta. The Bihar government identified 126 acres of land at Vishambharpur and Kutlupur for construction of the civil enclave. In November 2016, the Bihar cabinet approved a budget of 260 crore for the acquisition of 126 acres of land for the project.

The AAI and State Government approved the civil enclave design in July 2019, with construction expected to begin by the end of 2019. The first phase entails a two-stored building covering an area of 25,000 square metres. The civil enclave is expected to be ready by 2022 and will cost of over 500 crores.
In the first phase, the terminal building will be equipped with five aerobridges and parking bays for five aircraft. In the next phase, the terminal area will be doubled to 50,000 square metres with five additional aerobridges and five additional parking bays.
Of the 126 acres of land acquired by the State Government near Bihta airbase, 108 acres will be used by AAI to build the civil enclave while the remaining 18 acres will be used by the State Government for development of amenities, including a VIP lounge, a hotel and a hangar.
Bihar government transferred 108-acre land to the AAI for Bihta civil enclave. The built-up area of the terminal building at Bihta would be approximately 50,000 sq metres. Over Rs 350 crore is estimated to be spent on the project. Once completed, Bihta airport will have the capacity to handle 2.5 million passengers per annum (MPA).

Bihar government acquired 120 acres of land for construction of the new airport. Bihar cabinet approved a budget of Rs 260 crore for the acquisition of 126 acres for Bihta airport which was scheduled to be completed by October 2019. Of the 126 acres - 99 acres in Vishambhar and 27 acres in Kultupur localities from around 400 land owners were acquired for the new airport. An elevated expressway from Saguna Mor to Bihta is going to be constructed. Of the 120 acres of acquired land for Bihta Airport, 108 acres will be utilised for development of a civil enclave and the remaining 12 acres for development of amenities, including a VIP lounge, a hotel and a hangar.

Airport Authority had proposed 156 acres of land to the state government, apart from 128 acres which state government is to transfer, so that length of the runway could be increased to 12000 feet, in order to install advanced category-II Instrument Landing System (ILS) at new airport so that flights could land there at a visibility as low as 350 m.

Status
 October 2016 - Bihar cabinet approved the Patna master plan 2031 which envisages development of a new airport at Bihta.
 November 2016 -  Agreement reached between the Bihar government and the Union Civil Aviation Ministry to expand Bihar defence airbase.
 31 December 2018 - Airports Authority of India shortlisted Synergy Company to design Bihta Airport terminal building.
 3 June 2019 - Bihar Government approved a 20-km long four-lane Danapur-Shivala-Bihta elevated road at the cost of around Rs 2,000 crore. This highway will be completed by 2022 and will connect Patna to the upcoming civil airport at Bihta via Danapur railway station and Shivala Chowk. Of total 20 km length, 17 km would be elevated. The elevated portion would terminate at the junction of the Bihta-Sarmera Road near Kanhauli village. From that junction, the road would go up to the Bihta Chowk besides connecting the Bihta Airport; it would again be elevated at the Bihta Chowk.

See also
List of Indian Air Force bases
Danapur-Bihta elevated road

References

Airports in Bihar
Patna district
Indian Air Force bases
Airports with year of establishment missing